"Slippery When Wet" is the first official single from Nyanda. It was first released on SoundCloud on March 8, 2013. The music video was released on June 25, 2013. "Slippery When Wet" entered UK Music Week's Top 30 Urban Club Charts in Week 27 (2013) and remained in the Top 30 for 5 weeks, peaking at #13.

Music video

The music video for "Slippery When Wet" was directed and edited by Muss from Boss Playa.

Track listing

Charts

Club Charts

Licenses

Awards

References

External links
 

2013 singles
2013 songs
Reggae songs